Mikolas is both a given name and a surname. Notable people with the name include:

Mikoláš Aleš (1852–1913), Czech painter
Doug Mikolas (born 1961), American football player
Josef Mikoláš (1938–2015), Czech ice hockey player
Miles Mikolas (born 1988), American baseball player

See also
Mikola